The Yesenin Monument is a sculpture in the Tauride Garden in the centre of Saint Petersburg.  Made of white marble and set on a small pedestal, it represents the Russian poet Sergei Yesenin seated in a thoughtful pose.

The monument has been subjected to several attacks by vandals. It has been painted, and had its nose and fingers removed. After it was damaged a fourth time in 2009, the decision was made to make it less accessible, although it remains in its original location.

References 

Monuments and memorials in Saint Petersburg
Vandalized works of art in Russia